Jaime Lima (born 2 November 1949) is a Bolivian footballer. He played in five matches for the Bolivia national football team from 1975 to 1977. He was also part of Bolivia's squad for the 1975 Copa América tournament.

References

External links
 

1949 births
Living people
Bolivian footballers
Bolivia international footballers
Place of birth missing (living people)
Association football defenders
Club Blooming players
Club Bolívar players
C.D. Jorge Wilstermann players
The Strongest players